Dunedin East was a parliamentary electorate in the city of Dunedin in the Otago region of New Zealand from 1881 to 1890.

Population centres
The previous electoral redistribution was undertaken in 1875 for the 1875–1876 election. In the six years since, New Zealand's European population had increased by 65%. In the 1881 electoral redistribution, the House of Representatives increased the number of European representatives to 91 (up from 84 since the 1875–76 election). The number of Māori electorates was held at four. The House further decided that electorates should not have more than one representative, which led to 35 new electorates being formed, including Dunedin East, and two electorates that had previously been abolished to be recreated. This necessitated a major disruption to existing boundaries.

History
Dunedin East is one of the electorates that replaced the three-member City of Dunedin electorate. The other two electorates formed in 1881 were Dunedin Central and Peninsula.

Members of Parliament
The electorate was represented by three Members of Parliament:

Key

Election results

1887 election

1884 election

Notes

References

Historical electorates of New Zealand
Politics of Dunedin
1881 establishments in New Zealand
1890 disestablishments in New Zealand